is a Japanese farmer and amateur astronomer.

He is a prolific discoverer of minor planets, credited by the Minor Planet Center with the discovery and co-discovery of 32 numbered minor planets between 1986 and 1996. He also co-discovered 112P/Urata-Niijima, a periodic comet of the Jupiter family in 1986.

The main-belt asteroid 5507 Niijima, discovered by Takeshi Urata and Kenzo Suzuki, was named in his honor. Naming citation was published on 1 September 1993.

List of discovered minor planets

References 
 

1955 births
20th-century Japanese astronomers
Discoverers of asteroids

Living people